Botley is a hamlet in the civil parish of Chesham, in Buckinghamshire, England.

The hamlet name is Anglo Saxon in origin, and means Botta's Clearing.

Botley includes the Hen and Chickens public house and Goose Acre pond. Most of the houses in Botley are on Botley Road. Botley is divided between the civil parishes of Chesham and Latimer, and merges into the village of Ley Hill.

References

Chesham
Hamlets in Buckinghamshire